Caraipa is a plant genus in the family Calophyllaceae.

Species include:
Caraipa ampla
Caraipa densifolia
Caraipa grandifolia
Caraipa jaramilloi
Caraipa parvifolia
Caraipa psilocarpa
Caraipa punctulata
Caraipa racemosa
Caraipa richardiana
Caraipa savannarum
Caraipa tereticaulis
Caraipa utilis

References

http://www.mobot.org/MOBOT/research/ven-guayana/clusiaceae/caraipa.html

 
Malpighiales genera
Taxa named by Jean Baptiste Christian Fusée-Aublet